Alexey Korotylev (born 1 March 1977) is a Russian chess Grandmaster.

In 2001 he tied for 1st–2nd with Semen Dvoirys at the Geneva Open. In 2002 he tied for 2nd–5th with Vasily Yemelin, Pavel Smirnov and Alexander Rustemov in the Russian Chess Championship. In 2004 he qualified for the superfinal of the Russian championship in Moscow. With in total 11 players, Korotilev scored 4.5 points out of 10 games, amongst which a defeat of Alexander Grischuk and a draw against the winner Garry Kasparov. In 2009, he tied for 2nd–6th with Viorel Iordăchescu, Ernesto Inarkiev, Ian Nepomniachtchi and Sergei Tiviakov at the Moscow Open tournament.

Notable games
Alexey Korotylev vs Garry Kasparov, Russian Championships 2004, Queen's Indian Defense: Kasparov-Petrosian Variation, 1/2-1/2
Joost Wempe vs Alexey Korotylev, Corus Tournament: Group C 2005, Pirc Defense: Austrian Attack, 0-1

References

External links

1977 births
Living people
Chess grandmasters
Russian chess players